The Sociedad Económica de Amigos del País en Puerto Rico (1813–1899) was a learned society in Spanish colonial San Juan, Puerto Rico, modelled after the Sociedad Económica de los Amigos del País in Spain. The society published a newspaper, the short-lived Diario Económico de Puerto Rico (1814–1815), and organized a library in 1843. Members included Alejandro Ramírez (a founder) and Manuel Gregorio Tavárez.

References

Bibliography
  

1813 establishments in Puerto Rico
1899 disestablishments
Defunct organizations based in Puerto Rico
History of San Juan, Puerto Rico